The trading card game Magic: The Gathering has released a large number of sets since it was first published by Wizards of the Coast.  After the 1993 release of Limited Edition, also known as Alpha and Beta, roughly 3-4 major sets have been released per year, in addition to various spin-off products.

Magic has made three types of sets since Alpha and Beta: base/core sets, expansion sets, and compilation sets.  Expansion sets are the most numerous and prevalent type of expansion; they primarily consist of new cards, with few or no reprints, and either explore a new setting, or advance the plot in an existing setting. Base sets, later renamed core sets, are the successors to the original Limited Edition and are meant to provide a baseline Magic experience; they tended to consist either largely or entirely of reprints.  Compilation sets also exist entirely of reprints, and tend to be made as either a special themed product, or as a way to increase supply of cards with small printings.  Examples of compilation sets with randomized boosters include Chronicles and Modern Masters.  There also exist compilation products with a pre-selected and fixed card pool, such as the Duel Decks and From The Vault series. Theme decks serve a similar function; however, they are always attached to a specific set or block, while compilations are free to pick and choose cards from any set.

All expansion sets, and all editions of the base set from Sixth Edition onward, are identified by an expansion symbol printed on the right side of cards, below the art and above the text box. From Exodus onward, the expansion symbols are also color-coded to denote rarity: black for common and basic land cards, silver for uncommon, and gold for rare. Beginning with the Shards of Alara set, a red-orange expansion symbol denotes a new rarity: "Mythic Rare" (the Time Spiral set featured an additional purple coloration for "timeshifted" cards). For the early expansion sets (from Arabian Nights to Alliances), the rarities of cards were often much more complicated than the breakdown into common, uncommon, and rare suggests.  Cards in compilations are assigned partially arbitrary rarity by Wizards, with some cards assigned rare status and some assigned mythic rare in a given set.

Base/core set editions

After the second version (Beta) of the first set, which contained two cards mistakenly excluded from the first version (Alpha), all subsequent base sets through 10th Edition consisted of cards that had been printed before in either the original base set or an expansion set. Alpha through Fifth Edition did not have set symbols printed on the actual cards, though those sets were retroactively given set symbols in Wizards of the Coast's official Gatherer database of Magic cards.

Expansion sets
Expansion sets from Ice Age to Rivals of Ixalan (with the exception of Homelands) came in groups called "blocks". Blocks were cohesive products: they usually centered around one plane, followed a particular storyline, and contained cards and mechanics that supported both. Blocks generally consisted of one large "stand-alone" expansion set of 250-380 cards, followed by one or two small expansion sets of 141-200 cards which continue the themes introduced in the large set. Like the base set, stand-alone expansion sets contain basic land cards; other expansion sets do not. Beginning with Alliances, expansion sets were given codenames while in development; the code names of the expansions of a block usually fit together to form a phrase or common theme. Ice Age, Homelands, and Alliances were retroactively declared a block at some point, despite Homelands not being connected to the other two in any way. In 2006, WotC retroactively dropped Homelands from the Ice Age cycle and added Coldsnap to it. With the Zendikar cycle in 2009, the traditional large-small-small block structure began to be varied, with some blocks including a second large set later in the cycle. Starting with the Battle for Zendikar block in 2015, the default structure of a block was changed to large-small, with two blocks released per year and each block consisting of only two sets.

Ice Age and Alliances were the first two sets to have a well-defined relationship, but the idea of calling connected sets a "block" or "cycle" did not exist at the time of printing. Also beginning with Alliances in June 1996, expansion sets were released in a regular pattern: the base sets were released in October with the small expansion sets being released in February and June. With the exceptions of Stronghold, a 1998 set released in March rather than February, and Scourge, a 2003 set which was released in May rather than June, this pattern of months was never broken, over a 10-year period, until 2006, when Dissension was also released a month early in May instead of June, because of the July release of Coldsnap. The third set in a block has since been released in late April or early May. From 2005-2015, there was a fourth release date each year in mid-July, usually reserved for base sets. Other summer releases included Coldsnap and Eventide.

Fallen Empires was an experimental expansion in which most cards have three or four different pieces of artwork. You could see them as 121 common cards, by art, or 36 cards by the text. It was also a major expansion in the idea of tribes, especially Goblins and Merfolk.

Most early expansion sets did not have exact release dates; they were just shipped out within the space of a week, and retailers could start selling them as soon as the sets were received. By the time of Alliances in 1996, however, release dates were set as Mondays (the earliest set with an exact Monday release date might possibly have preceded Alliances, but Alliances is the earliest set with a cited and confirmed Monday release date). Beginning with Mirrodin in 2003, the release dates were changed from Monday to Friday. All sets beginning with Homelands also have a pre-release date, on which cards are sold in limited quantities in pre-release tournaments. These tournaments were formerly always held two weeks before the release date, but since Shards of Alara they are now held one week before the release date.

Premium cards have been inserted into booster packs since Urza's Legacy. Originally 1 premium card was inserted for every 100 cards. The ratio was changed to 1 in 70 cards with the Torment expansion. Beginning with Tenth Edition the rate was increased to 1 in 56 cards. This later changed to 1 in 45 cards with "Core Set 2020"

Starting with Battle for Zendikar cycle, sets sometimes also contain an entry in the Masterpiece Series.

The block model has evolved as time went on. In addition to a formalized structure (which was occasionally varied) Wizards began to have trouble developing small sets that satisfied their own quality standards. Players also reported fatigue at playing in the same environment for a year at a time. The decision to remove one small set from each block, as showcased in Battle For Zendikar block, was a result of this dissatisfaction. It culminated in the decision to delete small sets entirely; since the conclusion of Ixalan cycle, all sets have been large-sized sets. However, not all large-size sets will involve travel to a new plane; some will be sequels to the set prior to it, if the depth of the plane's story and mechanics allows. Dominaria, released in 2018, was the first set under this model.

Other sets

Non-rotation sets

These sets are legal in non-rotating formats such as Modern or Legacy, but not rotating formats such as Standard.

They are notably not legal in Pioneer.

Introductory sets
These introductory sets were intended for novice Magic: The Gathering players. They were illegal in sanctioned tournaments until October 2005, when they became legal in Legacy and Vintage.

Compilations/reprint sets
Reprint sets are sets of certain cards from previous sets that were re-released for different reasons. Some reasons include the cards were fan favorites and popular demand brought them back or in some cases, reprints were to commemorate certain events such as widely known matches or anniversary sets. Some reprint sets revolved around a certain theme; for example, Beatdown was themed around old, out-of-print, heavy-hitting creatures. Reprinting a card in one of these sets does not affect when it leaves Standard.

Deck Builder's Toolkits are released at the same time as a core set and contain only cards from sets that are legal in Standard at that time; they are not sets as such. These boxed sets therefore have no symbol or code of their own.

Masterpiece Series
Starting with the Kaladesh block, some sets include the Masterpiece Series. Wizards of the coast has stated "the Masterpiece Series... began with Zendikar Expeditions". They were retroactively added with the announcement of Kaladesh Inventions. Cards in the Masterpiece Series appear at a higher rarity than Mythic Rares, and consist of either reprints, or cards from the set whose packs they appear in.  However, they are not considered part of that set, and instead get their own expansion symbol; moreover, as with reprint sets (see below), printing in a Masterpiece Series entry does not affect format legality. Note that entries in the Masterpiece Series do not have expansion codes, except for Zendikar Expeditions, which has code "EXP".

The Guilds of Ravnica Mythic Edition is a package that is sold exclusively on Hasbro's website. It contains 24 Guilds of Ravnica packs, 8 of which contain a predetermined Masterpiece card.

On January 10, 2019, the Ravnica Allegiance Mythic Edition was announced. Unlike the Guilds of Ravnica version, the Ravnica Allegiance Mythic Edition will be sold on eBay and ship globally. It contains 24 Ravnica Allegiance packs, 8 of which contain a predetermined Masterpiece card.

The set codes listed below come from the 3-letter code printed on the card frames at the bottom.

Collector Booster Packs
Starting with the Ravnica Allegiance expansion, collector packs started. Wizards of the Coast also had collector packs (premium packs) in Shards of Alara, but no sets after that until Ravnica Allegiance. Collector packs in Throne of Eldraine consist of  five to six foil commons, three to four foil uncommons, three alternate art cards, one card from supplemental sets (from the Brawl deck series or planeswalker deck exclusive cards), one rare or mythic rare, one extended art rare or mythic rare, one foil rare or mythic rare, and a foil double faced token. Theros Beyond Death collector boosters consist of four to five foil commons, two to three foil uncommons, two full art foil basic lands, one card from supplemental sets (Theros Beyond Death planeswalker deck exclusive cards), one rare or mythic rare, one foil rare or mythic rare, two alternate art "Constellation" cards, and a foil double faced token.

Secret Lair

The Secret Lair Series is Wizard of the Coast's first full foray into selling single reprints directly to players.

The first Secret Lair series all consisted of alternate art reprints. Wizards of the Coast was trying to work with artists they usually didn't: street artists, comic book artists, album cover designers, etc. Alternately, they used traditional Magic artists working with very non-traditional art briefs. In some later series, original art was used in combination with alternate card frames.

With The Walking Dead series, the premise of only reprints with alternate art was abandoned. Mark Heggen revealed that R&D views the Secret Lair platform as a product-testing grounds platform that lets them try things they can't do in normal products. He acknowledged that it had been art up to 2020, but that they had broadened the concept to speak to audiences of different sizes. If they identify a small group that would be thrilled by a specific product, this could cater to them: "like the game of Magic the Secret Lair will always try new things and evolve - the first year focused on art which is the low hanging fruit" and "as we have new ideas and want to try new things to make the game joyful for more people, Secret Lair is the place to do that experimentation".

Even though the reaction among the fans was very negative, the Walking Dead was the best-selling drop, luring buyers from outside of the Magic world. This prompted the company to keep on experimenting in this realm and creating the Universes Beyond product line. "Universes Within" is the popular name given to cards that are functional reprints of Universes Beyond cards, made to fit within the lore of Magic: The Gathering.

Most cards are legal in the Vintage, Legacy and Commander formats.

Multiplayer-focused sets
Starting with Planechase in 2009, Wizards of the Coast has occasionally printed sets intended primarily for multiplayer play, which do not necessarily consist entirely of reprints but are not legal in Standard; a card printed in one of these is legal only in Eternal formats, and reprinting a card in one of these sets does not affect when it leaves Standard.  These sets usually consist of fixed decks.

Non-DCI-sanctioned-tournament-play-legal sets
These sets, though also published by Wizards of the Coast, are not legal for DCI-sanctioned tournament play.

Magic: The Gathering Online exclusive sets
These sets are exclusive to Magic: The Gathering Online.

Notes

: Two cards, the common Circle of Protection: Black and the rare Volcanic Island, were inadvertently left out of the printing of Alpha. Beta and Unlimited included the two missing cards as well as one additional alternate art variant of each of the five basic lands. Consequently, those two sets each have seven more cards than Alpha did.
: When the Revised Edition was in production in 1994, a number of problems with the set became apparent. Some cards' colors were washed-out. The picture and color foreground for the Serendib Efreet were wrong (not that this was the first such misprint), and there was a growing concern with the Satanic images on some of the cards. The solution was to print a "fixed" version of Revised Edition, code named "Edgar", which has since came to be known as Summer Magic because it was printed in the summer of 1994. The cards were distributed in regular Revised Edition boosters, but no Summer Edition starters were produced. Despite its intended function as a fixed Revised Edition, there were problems with Summer Magic. On some cards, the colors were too dark. Furthermore, Hurricane was printed as a blue card and thereby became the most famous and most desired Summer Magic card of all. The Serendib Efreet had its artwork corrected, but the artist name was still wrong, as was that of Plateau (which had, uniquely out of the cards in Revised, received new art, but not an updated artist credit to reflect that). Because of all these flaws, the entire print run was recalled and destroyed which led to Revised Edition shortage in 1994. However, a few booster boxes survived. Summer Magic cards can sell for over $1000 for notable cards and some as high $5000. Summer Magic cards can best be recognized by their 1994 copyright date.
: The only cards in Fifth Edition to have an expansion symbol were those printed in Simplified Chinese in 1998.
: In addition to the 350 cards normally available in booster packs, the Eighth Edition Core Game contained 7 "starter cards" not available in booster packs, labeled with collector numbers S1 through S7; 3 were marked common, 3 uncommon, and 1 rare. Ninth Edition contained 9, labeled S1 through S10 (omitting S6); 6 were marked common, 2 uncommon, and 1 rare. These were meant to introduce new players to the game; most were "vanilla" creatures.   Similarly, Magic 2015 contained 15 starter cards not contained in booster packs; 6 were marked common, 4 uncommon, and 5 rare.  Magic Origins contained 16 such cards.
: 14 of the commons were printed in two subtle variations (called "a" and "b") making 92 total cards but only 78 unique cards.
: 5 of the cards came in 4 alternate art versions making the set have 100 total cards but only 85 unique cards. The different art versions also differ in rarity causing these 5 cards to make up a total of 6 commons, 9 uncommons, and 6 rares.
: The first pre-release officially sponsored by Wizards of the Coast was held for Homelands in New York City. Ice Age, which preceded Homelands, had an unofficial widely attended pre-release in Toronto.
: 15 of the commons came in 4 alternate art versions, while 20 of them came in 3 alternate art versions causing 187 total cards but only 102 unique cards.
: Homelands was not designed as part of the Ice Age block and has no thematic link to Ice Age and Alliances. Wizards of the Coast retroactively declared it part of the Ice Age block in 1997 to fit with the then-emerging standard block structure.  Nearly a decade later in 2006, Coldsnap was released as a belated third entry to the Ice Age block.  Homelands was reverted to a standalone set.  Coldsnap was, for purposes of card legality, part of Time Spiral as far as rotation at the time, so it was legal to play in 2006-2008 era Standard formats.  (Wizards of the Coast would later separate Coldsnap and Time Spiral in Extended, however.)
: 25 commons had 2 alternate art versions making 140 total cards but only 115 unique cards.
: All commons had 2 alternate art versions making 199 total cards but only 144 unique cards and 55 unique commons.
: The Coalition was a group assembled by Urza to defend Dominaria against the invasion of the Phyrexians.
: Many creatures in the Onslaught Block had the ability to "morph." Morphed creatures looked like "clay spiders."
: This does not count the alternate art for the uncommon card . Counting each version separately, there are 89 uncommons and 307 cards in the set.
: In the Time Spiral Cycle there are special cards in each set that are "timeshifted". In Time Spiral TSP refers to all non-timeshifted cards in the set while TSB, which stands for "TimeShifted Bonus" (during development, the timeshifted cards were known as "bonus cards"), refers to the 121 timeshifted reprint cards. The timeshifted reprint cards have a purple expansion symbol and are not counted towards the number of cards in the set. Instead they form a subset with their own collector's numbers. Each Time Spiral booster pack contains exactly one Timeshifted bonus card, replacing a common. In Planar Chaos there are 45 Timeshifted Cards (20 common, 15 uncommon, and 10 rare), however, unlike in Time Spiral they were not reprints but instead they were existing cards from the past which were "colorshifted" (known, iconic cards that were printed in a different color). Colorshifted cards are recognizable by the white text for the name and type line and different background designs from the normal cards. In contrast to the timeshifted cards in Time Spiral the colorshifted cards in Planar Chaos and Future Sight are not bonus cards, meaning that they come in rarities of common, uncommon, and rare, and are counted towards the Collector's numbers of the set. However they are distributed differently than normal cards, with 3 of the commons in each booster being timeshifted, and one uncommon being replaced with a timeshifted uncommon 3/4 of the time and a timeshifted rare 1/4 of the time. In Future Sight there are 81 timeshifted Cards, composing 27 of each rarity; these were simply included in packs like ordinary cards of their rarity. However, unlike the previous sets these timeshifted cards have a future theme in that they have a different frame than normal cards and have keyword mechanics that may appear in future sets.
: Starting in Shards of Alara Wizards of the Coast introduced a new rarity level higher than rare called Mythic Rare. A mythic rare card will appear in approximately 1 out of every 8 booster packs instead of a rare.
: Chronicles, released in 1995 between Ice Age and Homelands, reprinted many previous cards, drawn from the Arabian Nights, Antiquities, Legends, and The Dark sets, that were becoming difficult to obtain but added no new cards to the game. Despite being published between Ice Age and Homelands, it is not considered part of the Ice Age Block; for purposes of tournament-legality, it was instead treated as an extension of Fourth Edition. The cards in Chronicles were reprinted with white borders, as opposed to their original black borders. Also Chronicles contained three uncommons with four alternate art versions meaning there are 125 total cards but only 116 unique cards and only 34 unique uncommons.
: Many of the early compilation sets did not have expansion symbols of their own and instead the cards within these reprint sets just retained the symbol from their former set.
: Portal was a series of sets featuring simplified rules intended to introduce novice players of Magic: The Gathering to the game. When they were originally released, they were not legal for DCI-sanctioned tournament play, but the DCI changed its policy and the Portal sets became legal in the Vintage and Legacy tournament formats on October 20, 2005.
: 5 of the commons and 2 of the uncommons were alternate versions, so there are only 200 unique cards (85 unique common, 55 unique uncommons) in Portal.
: Starter 2000 was made up of two 22-card decks and two 15-card packs, all with a fixed selection of cards.
: Astral is a set of 12 cards that was never actually printed on paper and exists only in the MicroProse Magic: The Gathering computer game (with the exception of the oversized Aswan Jaguar included in the box). All 12 cards had abilities that depended on randomness and were therefore more practical to use on the computer than on paper.
: The Un- sets are satirical sets which, though also published by Wizards of the Coast, are not legal for DCI-sanctioned tournament play.
: Unhinged contains 1 ultra-rare, called Super Secret Tech, which only exists as a foil rare card.
: The first event that used Mirage product was Pro Tour Atlanta on 13 September 1996.
: The Lorwyn and Shadowmoor blocks consist of two sets each. They were released over the course of one year and thus deviate from the usual three expansion sets per year policy. Eventide was the second set in the Shadowmoor block and was released in July.
: Of the cards in Innistrad, 6 commons, 7 uncommons, 6 rares, and 1 mythic are double-faced cards; though these appear in normal rarities, they are distributed differently, with one double-faced card always appearing per pack, replacing a common.  The same is true of Dark Ascension; it has 4 commons, 4 uncommons, 3 rares, and 2 mythics as double-faced cards.
: 10 of the commons in Dragon's Maze are reprints of the Guildgates from Return to Ravnica and Gatecrash; while these are common, they are distributed differently than other commons, in that they instead replace the basic land in the booster pack; basic lands do not appear in Dragon's Maze booster packs.  Furthermore, one of the mythic rares in Dragon's Maze, is distributed differently from the other mythic rares, in that it also replaces the basic land in the booster pack, rather than the rare.  In addition, the basic land may also be replaced with one of the "shock lands" from Return to Ravnica or Gatecrash; although these can appear in Dragon's Maze booster packs, they are not considered part of Dragon's Maze, being identical to the "shock lands" that appeared in Return to Ravnica and Gatecrash.
 10 of the commons in Fate Reforged are reprints of the dual lands from Khans of Tarkir; while these are common, these are distributed differently than other commons, in that they may appear in the basic land slot instead of a common slot.  In addition, the land slot may also contain one of the "fetch lands" from Khans of Tarkir; although these can appear in Fate Reforged booster packs, they are not considered part of Fate Reforged, being identical to the "fetch lands" that appeared in Khans of Tarkir.  In most languages, these are in fact ordinarily the only possibilities for the land slot; basic lands will not ordinarily appear except in Korean, Portuguese, Russian, and Traditional Chinese.
: Although the Masterpiece Series proper would not begin until Kaladesh block, something similar was done with Battle for Zendikar block in the form of Zendikar Expeditions.  There are 25 premium Zendikar Expeditions cards that may appear in Battle for Zendikar booster packs in place of a Battle for Zendikar premium card.  Similarly, there are 20 premium Zendikar Expeditions cards that may appear in Oath of the Gatewatch booster packs in a similar manner, and which are also not considered part of Oath of the Gatewatch. All Zendikar Expeditions cards, both those in Battle for Zendikar booster packs and those in Oath of the Gatewatch booster packs, have expansion code "EXP" in the official Gatherer database.  These cards are not included in the count here, but they may appear in booster packs.  See the Masterpiece Series section for more information.
: Of the cards in Shadows over Innistrad, 4 commons, 20 uncommons, 6 rares, and 3 mythics are double-faced cards; though these appear in normal rarities, they are distributed differently.  There is always one common or uncommon double-faced card always appearing per pack, replacing a normal common, and about 1 in 8 booster packs contain a rare or mythic double-faced card, also replacing a normal common.  In Eldritch Moon, 2 commons, 10 uncommons, 2 rares, and 1 mythic rare are double-faced cards; and 2 commons, 3 rares, and 1 mythic rare are meld cards, which have half of an extra-large card on their back face.
: Of the cards in Conspiracy, 9 commons, 8 uncommons, and 8 rares are draft-related cards; though these appear in normal rarities, they are distributed differently, with one draft-related card always appearing per pack, replacing the basic land.
: The Collector's Edition duplicated the Limited Edition Beta set with extra lands, had a gold bordered back instead of black, square corners instead of usual rounded, and "Collector's Edition" printed in gold on the cards.
: The International Collector's Edition duplicated the Limited Edition Beta set with extra lands, had a gold bordered back instead of black, square corners instead of usual rounded, and "International Edition" printed in gold on the cards.
: The Premium Foil Booster packs have a different ink formula than the foils released in Shards of Alara booster packs resulting in a light version and a dark version for each foil. The dark versions are from the actual Shards of Alara booster packs where as the light versions are from the Premium Foil Boosters.
: Several cards in Unstable appear in several variations which share a card number but have various differences; cards are numbered out of 216, but there are more distinct cards than this in the set.  In addition, one of the rares in the set, Steamflogger Boss, appears in the basic land slot, rather than the rare slot, and each booster pack contains exactly two Contraptions.

References

Further reading

External links
 Official Magic: The Gathering sets page from Wizards of the Coast
 Explanation of the meaning of every expansion symbol through Time Spiral

Magic: The Gathering